Legislative Assembly elections were held in Indian state of Rajasthan on 4 December 2008. Results were announced on 8 December. The incumbent ruling party BJP lost to Congress.

Results

Party-wise list of elected MLAs

Elected Members
List of Elected Members of Legislative Assembly

See also
 Member of the Legislative Assembly (India)

External links
 Rajasthan MLAs
 Rajasthan Infoline

2008 State Assembly elections in India
2008
2008
Constituencies of Rajsthan Assembly
December 2008 events in India